Ergo Kuld (born 23 August 1976) is an Estonian film director, cinematographer and producer.

Kuld was born in Tartu. In 1994, he graduated from Kullamaa Secondary School. Between 1998 and 2000, he studied photography at the Baltic Film and Media School in Tallinn and from 2000 until 2004 at Tallinn University as a cinematographer. In 2000, he worked as a photographer for the newspapers Äripäev and Postimees, and from in 2000 until 2002, as a photo editor for Postimees.

In 2019, Kuld's partner, actress and singer Grete Klein, gave birth to a daughter. In 2020, the couple wed.

Filmography
 2015 Varjudemaa
 2016 Doktor Silva
 2016 Papad mammad
 2017 Lillepood
 2017 Nukumaja
 2018 Miks mitte
 2019 Lahutus Eesti moodi
 2019 Reetur
 2019 Talve
 2020 Tulejoonel
 2021 Jahihooaeg
 2022 Soo
 2023 Suvitajad 
 2023 Vigased pruudid 

 Source: EFIS

References

1976 births
Living people
Estonian film directors
Estonian film producers
Estonian photographers
Tallinn University alumni
People from Tartu